Kim Farrant is an Australian film director best known for her work on Strangerland, Angel of Mine and The Weekend Away.

References

External links 

 

Living people
Australian film directors
Year of birth missing (living people)
Australian women film directors
Griffith Film School